Heidenheim is a municipality in the Weißenburg-Gunzenhausen district, in Bavaria, Germany.

Heidenheim is an old German market town, which resides in the administrative region of Middle Franconia in the middle of Bavaria. It belongs to the rural district called Weißenburg-Gunzenhausen.
It is the administrative center of the local region called Hahnenkamm.

Geography
Heidenheim is located in the administration region West Middle Franconia (Westmittelfranken). Following local subdistricts belong to Heidenheim: Degersheim, Hechlingen am See, Hohentrüdingen.

History
Heidenheim was first mentioned in the year 742. During that time the double monastery of Heidenheim am Hahnenkamm (housing monks and nuns), was founded by Saint Willibald and was later led by Saint Walpurga who became abbess after his death. Secular power was represented by the Earl of Truhendingen (Altentrühdingen), later Duke of Bavaria, burgrave of Nuremberg (Hohenzollern). After that, Heidenheim belonged to the Margrave of Ansbach. Due to the Reformation, the monastery was closed in 1537. Since then Heidenheim is mostly Lutheran.
In 1792 Prussia bought principality of Ansbach and henceforth Heidenheim. As part of Ansbach Heidenheim was transferred back to Bavaria due to the contract of Paris (February 1806) to Bavaria.

See also
 , a former Benedictine foundation

References

External links 
 Markt Heidenheim am Hahnenkamm

Weißenburg-Gunzenhausen